Bougainvilliidae is a family of marine hydroids in the class Hydrozoa. Members of the family are found worldwide. There are sixteen accepted genera and about ninety-three species.

Description
Hydroids in this family can be solitary or colonial. When colonial, the hydranths or hydroid polyps are either linked by stolons or are branched. The hydranths have one or more whorls of fine tentacles. The gonophores are free-living medusae or are fixed sporosacs. The medusae are bell-shaped with a circular mouth and branched oral tentacles inserted above the rim of the mouth, ending in clusters of nematocysts.

Genera
 Bimeria Wright, 1859
 Bougainvillia Lesson, 1830
 Chiarella Maas, 1897
 Dicoryne Allman, 1859
 Garveia Wright, 1859
 Koellikerina Kramp, 1939
 Millardiana Wedler & Larson, 1986 (tentatively placed here)
 Nemopsis Agassiz, 1849
 Nubiella Bouillon, 1980
 Pachycordyle Weismann, 1883
 Parawrightia Warren, 1907
 Rhizorhagium M. Sars, 1874
 Silhouetta Millard & Bouillon, 1973
 Thamnostoma Haeckel, 1879
 Velkovrhia Matjasic & Sket, 1971

References

 
Filifera
Cnidarian families